Mona Barthel was the defending champion, but lost in the first round to Kirsten Flipkens.

Anastasia Pavlyuchenkova won the title, defeating Sara Errani in the final, 3–6, 6–2, 6–3.

Seeds
The top four seeds receive a bye into the second round.

Draw

Finals

Top half

Bottom half

Qualifying

Seeds

Qualifiers

Lucky losers
  Barbora Záhlavová-Strýcová

Qualifying draw

First qualifier

Second qualifier

Third qualifier

Fourth qualifier

References
 Main Draw
 Qualifying Draw

2014 WTA Tour
2014 Singles